The 2020 United States Senate election in Wyoming was held on November 3, 2020, to elect a member of the United States Senate to represent the State of Wyoming, concurrently with the 2020 U.S. presidential election, as well as other elections to the United States Senate in other states and elections to the United States House of Representatives and various state and local elections. Republican Cynthia Lummis defeated Democrat Merav Ben-David by more than 46 percentage points, becoming the first female U.S. Senator from Wyoming and succeeding incumbent Republican Mike Enzi, who did not run for reelection. This was the first open Senate seat since 1996 where Enzi was first elected. The Democratic and Republican party primary elections were held on August 18, 2020.

Republican primary

Candidates

Nominee
Cynthia Lummis, former U.S. Representative for Wyoming's at-large congressional district and former Treasurer of Wyoming

Eliminated in primary
Robert Short, Converse County commissioner and businessman
R. Mark Armstrong, geologist
Devon Cade, businessman
John Holtz, attorney and U.S. Air Force veteran
Michael Kemler
Bryan Miller, candidate for U.S. Senate in 2014
Donna Rice, estate lawyer
Star Roselli, conspiracy theorist
Joshua Wheeler, Wyoming Army National Guard veteran

Withdrawn
Patrick Dotson, retiree
Rolland Holthus

Declined
Liz Cheney, incumbent U.S. Representative for Wyoming's at-large congressional district, Chair of House Republican Conference, and daughter of the 46th Vice President Dick Cheney (running for re-election)
Mike Enzi, incumbent U.S. Senator (endorsed Cynthia Lummis)
Foster Friess, businessman and former governor candidate
Robert Grady, policy adviser to former President George H. W. Bush
Matt Mead, former Governor of Wyoming
Marian Orr, mayor of Cheyenne (running for re-election)
Donald Trump Jr., businessman and son of President of the United States Donald Trump

Endorsements

Polling

Results

Democratic primary

Candidates

Nominee
Merav Ben-David, Chair of the Department of Zoology and Physiology at the University of Wyoming and wildlife ecologist

Eliminated in primary
Kenneth R. Casner, Democratic candidate for the 2018 Wyoming gubernatorial election and Democratic nominee for District 47 of the Wyoming House of Representatives in 2016
James DeBrine, progressive activist
Yana Ludwig, democratic socialist activist and community organizer
Nathan Wendt, think tank executive, management consultant, businessman, entrepreneur
Rex Wilde, veteran, service technician, Democratic candidate for the 2018 Wyoming gubernatorial election and Democratic candidate for the 2014 United States Senate election in Wyoming

Withdrawn
Chuck Jagoda, teacher

Endorsements

Results

General election

Predictions

Endorsements

Polling

Results 

Lummis outperformed fellow Republican Donald Trump in the concurrent presidential election by 2.9%, or 4,541 votes. She also won Albany County by 1%, or 182 raw votes, while Trump lost it by 2.7%, or 513 votes. She performed significantly better in the Democratic stronghold of Teton County, receiving 37.3% of the total vote, compared to Trump's 29.6%. Lummis’s over-performance was likely in part due to the fact that there were no third-party candidates running in the Senate race, while the presidential race saw Libertarian Jo Jorgensen winning 5,768 votes, or 2.1% of the vote, and independent candidate Brock Pierce getting 2,208 votes, or 0.8%.

Counties that flipped from Republican to Democratic
 Teton (largest municipality: Jackson)

Notes
Partisan clients

Voter samples and additional candidates

References

External links
 
 
  (State affiliate of the U.S. League of Women Voters)
 

Official campaign websites
 Merav Ben-David (D) for Senate
 Cynthia Lummis (R) for Senate

2020
Wyoming
United States Senate
Open seats in the 2020 United States Senate elections